Mannucci is an Italian surname. Notable people with the surname include:

Lucia Mannucci (1920–2012), Italian singer
Filippo Mannucci (born 1974), Italian rower
Gaspare Mannucci, Italian Baroque painter
Paolo Mannucci (born 1942), Italian cyclist

See also
Carlos A. Mannucci, a Peruvian football club
2219 Mannucci, a main-belt asteroid

See also
 Manucci

Italian-language surnames